Arthur Gill may refer to:

 Eric Gill  (Arthur Eric Rowton Gill, 1882–1940), English sculptor, typeface designer, stonecutter and printmaker
 Arthur Gill (priest) (1898–?), Archdeacon of Cloyne
 Arthur B. Gill (1876–1965), American football coach, orthopedic surgeon and college professor